Watanabe ( and other variants) is a Japanese surname derived from the noble and samurai Watanabe clan, a branch of the Minamoto clan, descending from the Emperor Saga (786-842), the 52nd Emperor of Japan, and refers to a location called 'Watanabe no tsu' which was settled by the Watanabe clan, who took the name of the place. It was located in the medieval period near the mouth of the Yodogawa River in Settsu Province, in present-day city of Osaka.

History

Origin
The surname Watanabe comes from the Watanabe clan founded by Watanabe no Tsuna (953-1025), of the Saga Genji branch of the Minamoto clan, and his official name was Minamoto no Tsuna. He established the Watanabe branch of the Minamoto clan, taking the name from his stronghold at Watanabe no tsu, a port on the Yodogawa River in Settsu Province, and in 1020 he was appointed Tango no Kami (Governor of Tango Province). He was the son of Minamoto no Atsuru (933-953), married to a daughter of the Chinjufu-shōgun (Commander in chief of the defense of the north) Minamoto no Mitsunaka (912-997); he was the grandson of Minamoto no Tsuko (891-942), Musashi no Kami (Governor of Musashi province); was the great-grandson of Minamoto no Noboru (848-918), Dainagon (Chief Councilor of State); great-great-grandson of Minamoto no Tōru (822-895), Sadaijin (Minister of the Left); and was the great-great-great-grandson of the Emperor Saga (786-842), the 52nd Emperor of Japan. He was the stepgrandson of the Chinjufu-shōgun Minamoto no Mitsunaka, a descendant of the Emperor Seiwa (850-881), and having lost his father the year of his birth, he was adopted by Minamoto no Atsushi, a descendant of the Emperor Ninmyō (808-850), and son in law of Mitsunaka. He was companion in arms to his stepuncle Minamoto no Yorimitsu (944–1021), son of Mitsunaka; and is famous for his military exploits in a number of tales and legends. He is known as one of the Four Guardian Kings (Shitennō) of Yorimitsu, referring to the Buddhist Four Heavenly Kings.

Heian period to the Genpei war

Watanabe no Den, great-grandson of Tsuna, received from the Emperor Shirakawa (1053-1129) the hereditary title of Shokan (Governing officer) of the huge Oe no Mikuriya estate, and in Kyoto he inherited the military charges of Takiguchi no musha (Takiguchi warriors Guards of the Imperial Palace), as well as Emonfu (Government office of the Outer Palace Gate Guards) and Hyoefu (Administrative office of Middle Palace Guards).

Dominating Settsu Province as a focal area of maritime transportation in medieval Japan, the Watanabe family spread its influence widely. Their descendants settled in other areas, including Kyushu. 

Watanabe Hisashi (1064-1148 or 1154), also called Minamoto no Hisashi, great-grandson of Tsuna, was appointed Kebiishi (Chief of the police and justice), received the title of Shokan (Governing officer) of Uno no Mikuriya estate in Matsuura (Hizen province, in Kyushu) and called himself Matsuura Hisashi. He ruled the County of Matsuura, the province of Iki, and a part of Sonogi district, and is the ancestor of the Matsuura Watanabe branch, Lords of Hirado castle.

The priest Mongaku Shōnin who urged Minamoto no Yoritomo (1147–1199) to start a war against the Taira, and who managed to get a letter from the Emperor Go-Shirakawa (1127–1192) to Yoritomo, requesting that he set up an army and liberate the country from the tyranny of the Taira, which enabled the Minamoto clan to take up arms, was the son of Watanabe no Endo Mochito.

During the Hōgen rebellion (1156), and the Genpei War (1180–1185), the Watanabe sided with Minamoto no Yorimasa (1106–1180), until his death at the Battle of Uji, then with Minamoto no Yoritomo.

At the Battle of Uji (1180), the opening battle of the Genpei War, the Watanabe clan formed with the warrior monks of Miidera Temple most of the Minamoto clan army.
 
The Heike Monogatari describes some of the Watanabe samurai present at this battle :
 Watanabe Choshichi Tonō : "He was attired that day in a samurai clothing of light green, and body armour ornamented with cherry blossoms on a yellow ground, and wore a sword with mounts of red copper; in his quiver he carried twenty four arrows feathered with white and under his arm was a bow lacquered in black and bound with red bands".
 Watanabe no Kiō : "clad in a brocaded hunting suit profusely embroidered with chrysanthemums, and wearing a general's armour of scarlet; its name was Kisenaga, and it had been a treasured heirloom for many generations. On his head was a helmet shining with silver stars, and a splendid sword hung at his side. In his quiver were twenty four arrows barred with black on their white feathers, not to speak of the special arrow, feathered with a hawk's wing, always carried by the Imperial Guards of the Takiguchi. His bow was a 'shigeto' of black lacquer with red binding. He rode on (the horse named) Nanryo, while one of his servants followed with a remount and another bore his shield under his arm".

Both were killed in battle. Were also present that day from the Watanabe clan : Minamoto no Sazuku, Minamoto no Tsuranu, Watanabe Habuku, Minamoto no Okoru, and others, who fought to death and were killed fighting against the Taira.

The Watanabe had a powerful navy, and in 1185 they sent their navy ships to support the Minamoto cause.

In February 1185, the Minamoto army of Minamoto no Yoshitsune, brother of Yoritomo, stayed at Watanabe no tsu, in the lands of the Watanabe clan, to rest, gather troops, army provisions, and prepare a fleet of ships for the raid in Shikoku.

At the Battle of Yashima (March 1185) the Watanabe horsemen proved to be decisive, and due to the fall of Yashima, the Taira clan lost their bases in Shikoku.

At the Battle of Dan-no-ura (April 1185), when the Dowager Empress Kenrei-mon-In, daughter of Taira no Kiyomori, tried to drown herself, she was pulled out by the samurai Watanabe no Mutsuru.

Kamakura to Muromachi periods

After the Genpei war, the Matsuura Watanabe received the additional titles of Gokenin (Direct Retainer of the Shogunate), and of Jitō (Military Governor). During the Mongol invasions (1274 and 1281), the Matsuura Watanabe fought fiercely to repel the invaders. Sashibo, the Soryo (Heir) of the Matsuura Watanabe and his cousin Yamashiro Kai, from the Yamashiro Watanabe branch descending from Oi, sixth son of Watanabe Hisashi, were killed in battle fighting against the Mongols.

The Kamachi were direct descendants of Minamoto no Noboru (848-918), like their cousins of the Watanabe clan, and had the titles of Shokan (Governing officer) of Kanzaki no shō estate (Hizen province), of Gokenin, of Jitō (Military Governor) of the County of Mizuma (Chikugo province), and held the court rank of Kizoku (Officer). Minamoto no Hisanao, son of Watanabe Hisashi, was 'Uhyoe no jo' (Officer of the guards of the Middle Palace), and owner of Mikuriya no shō estate. After the Jōkyū War (1221), Hisanao's son, Minamoto no Sanen, was adopted by the Kamachi as their son in law to succeed their estates and titles; he changed his name to Kamachi, and was the founder of the Kamachi Watanabe branch, Lords of Kamachi castle. At the time of the Mongol invasions, Morohisa went to the front as a member of the Matsuura Watanabe clan.

In 1235, the Watanabe clan received from the Kamakura shogunate the responsibility of overseeing large shipments of tax and tributes due the shogunate from the provinces of western and central Japan

During the period of the Northern and Southern Courts (1336-1392), the Matsuura Watanabe sided with the Northern Court, and fought at the Battle of Chikugogawa (1359). The Kamachi Watanabe sided with the Southern Court, and Takehisa was killed at the Battle of Tatarahama (1336).

Watanabe Mochi, descendant of Watanabe no Tsuna, rendered distinguished military service to the Shogun Ashikaga Takauji (1305-1358), and was granted the title of Jitō (Military Governor) of Yamada no shō territory (Bingo Province). He is the ancestor of the Yamada Watanabe branch, Lords of Ichijoyama castle, who owned the whole area of the Peninsula of Numakuma. During the Ōnin War (1467-1477), they sided with the Eastern camp. They were treated by the Ashikaga Shoguns as equal to a Shugo (Governor of province), and were allowed to use the 'Shirokasabukuro' and 'Mosen kuraoi' seals allowed only to the Shugo in the Muromachi period.

Sengoku period

During the 16th century wars, the following Watanabe samurai distinguished themselves :
 Watanabe Tōru († 1543), also called Kayo, descendant of the Matsuura Watanabe, was the son of Watanabe Suguru († 1524), Lord of Nagamiyama castle, and was a General of Mōri Motonari. In 1540, at the Battle of Yoshida-Koriyama, he was the Commander of a detached force, attacked a much larger army and defeated Amago Sanehisa's army. In 1543, at the Battle of Gassan-Toda, he was killed in a fierce battle in place of Motonari. After that the Mōri clan continued to give important posts to the Watanabe family, and the Watanabe clan members were honored at the head of the Choshu Mōri Domain's New Year's Kachu-kaiki ceremony for generations.
 Watanabe Hajime (1534-1612), son of Watanabe Tōru, fought at the Battle of Kanbe (1548), against the Hiraga clan of Takayatozaki castle (1551), against the Miya clan of Takiyama castle (1552), at Miyajima (1555) and Moji (1561). In 1586, he took part in the invasion of Kyushu, and in 1588, he went to Kyoto with Mōri Terumoto, and received from Toyotomi Hideyoshi the title of Hida no kami (Governor of Hida Province). He is listed as one of the eighteen Generals of the Mōri.
 Watanabe Tadasu († 1615) was a descendant of the Matsuura Watanabe, and a retainer of the Toyotomi clan. He took a part in the Battle of Dōmyōji (1615), in the Battle of Tennōji (1615), and died at the Siege of Osaka castle (1615).
 Watanabe Motoharu, of the Yamada Watanabe branch, Jitō (Military Governor) of Yamada, Lord of Ichijoyama castle, was a direct retainer of the Shogun Ashikaga Yoshiaki (1537-1597). At the Battle of Sekigahara, he fought against Tokugawa Ieyasu. After that his family was deprived of their fiefs.
 The Matsuura Watanabe of Izumi, were Shugodai (vice-Governors) of Izumi province and Lords of Kishiwada Castle. In 1527, they were involved in the administration of Izumi province as Shugodai, and in 1548 they sided with the Miyoshi clan . However when Magohachiro succeeded his father, he was still a child, and the Miyoshi while recognizing his position, sent their troops in Kishiwada Castle to protect the young lord. In 1562, Tora became Lord of Kishiwada with the aid of the Miyoshi army, but the Lordship changed again to his cousin Magohachiro, also called Hikaru, who later became Hizen no kami (Governor of Hizen Province).  In 1585, Munekiyo with Nakamura Kazuuji and 8,000 men were besieged by 30,000 men (Battle of Kishiwada), and the castle was rebuilt as the base of Toyotomi Hideyoshi's conquest of Kishu. For his military achievement, Munekiyo was given additional territories and transferred to Ise Province. Hisanobu, also called Hideto, was Lord of Ise Iyo castle, Iyo no Kami (Governor of Iyo province), and the General of the gun division of Toyotomi Hideyoshi; during the Sekigahara campaign, he was killed at the Battle of Anotsu (1600). At the Battle of Sekigahara (1600), they sided against the Tokugawa, and were deprived of their fiefs.  
 Watanabe Moritsuna (1542–1620), descended from the Matsuura Watanabe, through Watanabe Yasushi, grandson of Matsuura Hisashi, great-grandson of Watanabe no Tsuna. His ancestors were direct retainers of the Ashikaga Shoguns, and later moved to Mikawa province, thence they were called the Mikawa Watanabe branch. He joined Tokugawa Ieyasu in 1557, and fought at the Battles of Yawata (1562), Anegawa (1570), Mikatagahara (1573), Nagashino (1575), Komaki and Nagakute (1584), and the Siege of Osaka (1614-1615). He is listed as one of the sixteen Generals of Tokugawa Ieyasu. He was the Lord of Terabe castle, General of the Shogun Tokugawa Ieyasu  (1543-1616), and is the ancestor of the Hakata Watanabe branch, Lords of Hakata, and the Hanzo Watanabe branch, Lords of Terabe, and Hida no Kami (Governors of Hida province).

Edo period to the Meiji Restoration

Besides the mainstream of Watanabe, the Matsuura branch, had the title of Daimyō (Grand feudal Lords) of Hirado Domain (Hizen Province) until 1868, were the most famous and flourished branch, and had a revenue of 61,700 koku. The territories of the Lords of Hirado included the Province of Iki (with the County of Iki (11 villages), and the County of Ishida (11 villages)); in the Province of Hizen : the County of Matsuura (47 villages), and 7 villages in the County of Sonogi.

The Matsuura Watanabe of Hirado Shinden, Daimyō of Hirado Shinden Domain (Hizen Province) until 1868, descending from the fourth Lord of Hirado, was given 10,000 koku, and established a branch domain.

The Hakata Watanabe branch, were Daimyō (Grand feudal Lords) of Hakata Domain (Izumi Province) until the Meiji Restoration (1868), had a revenue of 13,500 koku, and descend from Watanabe Yoshitsuna (1611-1668), who was appointed Sobayonin (Grand Chamberlain) by Tokugawa Ietsuna (1651–1680), the 4th Tokugawa Shogun, and was the grandson of Moritsuna. The territories of the Lords of Hakata included in the Province of Izumi : 12 villages in the County of Otori, 4 villages in the County of Izumi; in the Province of Kawachi : 5 villages in the County of Furuichi, 5 villages in the County of Shiki, and 2 villages in the County of Tanboku; in the Province of Omi : 1 village in the County of Kurita, 2 villages in the County of Yasu, 2 villages in the County of Gamo, and 6 villages in the County of Takashima.

The Hanzo Watanabe branch, descending from Watanabe Shigetsuna (1574-1648), son of Moritsuna, were lords of Terabe estate, Hida no Kami (Governors of Hida province), Karō (Chief retainers) of the Owari Tokugawa, and had a revenue of 10,000 koku. After 1868, they were raised to the Peerage. 

The Watanabe of Ōmura (Hizen Province) were ranked among the Peers after 1868.

The Watanabe of Suwa (Shinano Province) were also raised to the Peerage after 1868.

Several Watanabe samurai had the title of Taishin (Grand) Hatamoto (Guardians of the Banner), the last rank before Daimyo, direct retainers of the Shogunate, high ranking samurai, and senior retainers of the Tokugawa Shoguns and their principal branches, like the descendants of :

  Watanabe Terutsuna, Noto no Kami (Governor of Noto province), and Taishin Hatamoto with a revenue of 6,000 koku.
  Watanabe Zonosuke, a Taishin Hatamoto.
  Watanabe Shinzaemon, younger brother of Moritsuna, and ancestor of the Shinzaemon Watanabe branch, senior retainers of the Owari Tokugawa. His descendant, Watanabe Aritsuna (1820-1868), was the Commander of the Owari Tokugawa army; he fought at the first Choshu war (1864), the second Choshu war (1865), and was killed in 1868.
  Watanabe Tozutsuna, Karō (Chief retainer) of the Tayasu Tokugawa, and of the Hitotsubashi Tokugawa.
  Watanabe Naotsuna, Wakasa no Kami (Governor of Wakasa province), had a revenue of 8,000 koku, and was the founder of the Wakasa Watanabe branch, Karō (Chief retainers) of the Kishū Tokugawa.

Gallery

Miscellaneous

, means ‘to cross over a river’.

According to the 'Japanese Family Names and Family Crests', the surname Watanabe is a toponymic surname (and never an occupational surname). In Japan, there are very few occupational surnames, and unlike in several european countries, in Japan, occupational surnames are the exceptions. The surname Watanabe is not considered one of these very few exceptions. A basic translation of the name of the original village 渡辺 is ‘to cross over a river’, and sometimes simple people write that Watanabe are 'river crossers' which is false.

The location called 'Watanabe no tsu' was located between Tenmabashi Station and Tenjinbashi Station, in the present day Osaka City.

Watanabe no Tsuna took charge of Zama jinja Temple, also called Ikasuri Shrine. The hereditary guji (chief priest) of the temple were descending from Watanabe Kaoru, descendant of Watanabe no Tsuna. The original site of the shrine was different from the current one, and the main hall was in the place where Watanabe no tsu used to be. Toyotomi Hideyoshi relocated to its current location near Nishiyokoborikawa River, at the address 3 Watanabe, 4-chome Watanabe, Kyutaromachi, Chuo Ward, Osaka City.

It is the fifth most common Japanese surname.

In the context of the Japanese economy, Mrs. Watanabe is a generic name for housewives who deal in foreign exchange.

People with the surname

A
, Japanese badminton player
, Japanese voice actress
, Japanese composer
, Japanese animator
, Japanese special effects art director
, Japanese motocross racer
, Japanese Scouting leader
, Japanese shogi player
, Japanese model, actress and singer
, Japanese sprint canoeist
, Japanese politician
, Japanese actor
, Japanese actor
, Japanese footballer
, Japanese murder victim
, Japanese anime director
, Japanese actress

C
, Japanese screenwriter
, Japanese supercentenarian
Corinne Watanabe (born 1950), American judge

D
, Japanese footballer
, Japanese video game writer
, Japanese actor
, Japanese long jumper

E
, Japanese figure skater
, Japanese actress

G
Gedde Watanabe (born 1955), American actor and comedian
Graham Watanabe (born 1982), American snowboarder
Greg Watanabe (born 1967), American actor

H
Hajime Watanabe (disambiguation), multiple people
, Japanese singer
, Japanese ice hockey player
, Japanese artistic gymnast
, Japanese politician
, Japanese footballer
, Japanese film director
, Japanese footballer
, Japanese sprint canoeist
, Japanese politician
, Japanese shogi player
, Japanese animation director
, Japanese equestrian
, Japanese photographer
, Japanese weightlifter
, Japanese actor
, Japanese baseball player and manager
, Japanese photographer
, Japanese motorcycle racer
Haruto Watanabe (渡邊晴人 , born 2004), Japanese kpop idol

I
, Japanese footballer
, Japanese swimmer

J
, Japanese handball player
, Japanese boxer and yakuza
Jolene Watanabe (born 1968), American tennis player
José Watanabe (1946–2007), Peruvian poet
, Japanese general
, Japanese actor
, Japanese architect
, Japanese writer
, Japanese footballer
, Japanese boxer
, Japanese fashion designer

K
, Japanese engineer
, Japanese swimmer
, Japanese photographer
, Japanese writer
Kathy Watanabe, American politician
, President of Toyota Motor Corporation
, Japanese boxer
, Japanese baseball player
, Japanese painter, scholar and statesman
, Japanese boxer, kickboxer and mixed martial artist
, Japanese footballer
Kazuki Watanabe (disambiguation)
, Japanese Roman Catholic nun, educator and writer
, Japanese footballer
, Japanese motorcycle racer
, Japanese musician
, Japanese long-distance runner
, Japanese sport shooter
, Japanese cyclist
, Japanese swimmer
, Japanese amateur astronomer and discoverer of minor planets
, Japanese scholar and translator
, Japanese footballer
, Japanese speed skater
, Japanese actor
Kiiko Watanabe, Japanese table tennis player
, Japanese-Filipino judoka
, Japanese footballer
, Japanese tennis player
, Japanese badminton player
, Japanese actress and television personality
, Japanese footballer
, Japanese field hockey player
Kozo Watanabe (disambiguation), multiple people
, Japanese voice actress
, Japanese politician

L
, Japanese beauty pageant winner

M
, Japanese actress
Makoto Watanabe (disambiguation), multiple people
Makoto Sei Watanabe (born 1952), Japanese architect
, Japanese film director, screenwriter and actor
, Japanese footballer
, Japanese shogi player
, Japanese singer
, Japanese singer, actress and television personality
, Japanese shogi player
Masaki Watanabe (1911–1995), Japanese orthopedic surgeon
, Japanese footballer
, Japanese manga artist
, Japanese communist
, Japanese general
, Japanese footballer and manager
, Japanese baseball player
, Japanese chemist
, Japanese politician
, Japanese singer, actress and idol
, Japanese journalist and media scholar
, Japanese sprinter
, Japanese composer
, Japanese politician
, Japanese musician and actress
, Japanese businessman and politician
, Japanese judoka
, Japanese idol and singer
, Japanese actor
, Japanese voice actress
, Japanese actress
, Japanese singer
, Japanese footballer
, Japanese footballer
, Japanese singer, actress and idol
, president of the International Gymnastics Federation
, Japanese samurai

N
, Japanese singer
Naoko Watanabe (disambiguation), multiple people
, Japanese actress and comedian
, Japanese baseball player
, Japanese footballer
, Japanese actress and model
, Japanese actress
, Japanese ice dancer

O
, Japanese writer
, Japanese sport wrestler

R
, Japanese idol and model
, Japanese idol and model
Ryo Watanabe (disambiguation), multiple people
, Japanese pink film actress
, Japanese footballer
, Japanese footballer

S
Sadao Watanabe (disambiguation), multiple people
, Japanese gymnast
, Japanese squash player
, Japanese theoretical physicist
, Japanese beach volleyball player
, Japanese footballer
, Japanese anime director and voice actor
, Japanese anime director, screenwriter and producer
, Japanese mathematician
, Japanese academic and writer
, Japanese politician
Shōtei Watanabe (1851–1918), Japanese painter
, Japanese printmaker
, Japanese politician
, Japanese actor
Shunji Watanabe (born 1938), Japanese karateka
, Japanese baseball player
, Japanese volleyball player
, Japanese footballer
, Japanese sprinter
, Japanese engineer and mathematician
, Japanese footballer and manager
Sylvia Watanabe, American writer

T
, Japanese politician
, Japanese computer engineer
, Japanese manga artist
, Japanese professional wrestler best known as Evil
, Japanese sprinter
, Japanese footballer
, Japanese politician
, Japanese anime director
, Japanese Nordic combined skier
, Japanese table tennis player
, Japanese musician and composer
Takeshi Watanabe (disambiguation), multiple people
, Japanese footballer
, Japanese footballer
, Japanese mountain climber
, Japanese ski jumper
, Japanese badminton player
, Japanese actor
Tokutarō Watanabe, Japanese businessman
, Japanese politician
, Japanese musician and composer
, Japanese golfer
, Japanese samurai
, Japanese businessman
, Japanese actor and television personality
, Japanese footballer

Y
, Japanese footballer
, Japanese sport wrestler
, Japanese anthropologist
, Japanese opera singer
, Japanese artist
, Japanese footballer
, Japanese manga artist, illustrator and animator
, Japanese politician
, alleged yakuza
, Japanese photographer
, Japanese footballer
, Japanese footballer
, Japanese voice actress, actress and singer
Yuichi Watanabe, Japanese mixed martial artist
, Japanese speed skater
, Japanese businessman and writer
, Japanese women's footballer
, Japanese basketball player
, Japanese badminton player
, Japanese figure skater

Fictional characters
Cameron Watanabe, the Green Samurai Ranger from Power Rangers Ninja Storm
Eva Watanabe, a character that dies in Friday the 13th Part VIII: Jason Takes Manhattan
, a character in the anime series Star Driver
Kanji Watanabe, the central character in Akira Kurosawa's 1952 film Ikiru
, a character in the light novel series The Irregular at Magic High School
Kimi Watanabe Finster, Chuckie's stepsister from Rugrats
Mia Watanabe, the Pink Ranger from Power Rangers Samurai
, a character in the manga series The Prince of Tennis
, a character in the manga series The Kawai Complex Guide to Manors and Hostel Behavior
Terry Watanabe, a character from Power Rangers Samurai
Toru Watanabe, the protagonist of Haruki Murakami's 1987 novel Norwegian Wood
, a character in the media franchise Love Live! Sunshine!!
Ryo Watanabe (リョウ ワタナベ), the boss character in the 2007 racing game Need for Speed: ProStreet

See also
List of common Japanese surnames
Watanabe Tekkōjo, steel foundry, renamed in 1943 to Kyūshū Heiki (Kyūshū Armaments), dissolved in 2001
Watanabe Instruments, later Graphtec Corporation
 The Watanabes, hit group of Tokyo-based international Indie/acoustic band

Notes

References

Japanese-language surnames
Minamoto clan

ja:渡辺氏